Hana Orgoníková (8 December 1946 – 5 June 2014) was a Czech politician. She was an MP for the Czech Social Democratic Party (ČSSD) from 1989 until her death.

Orgoníková was born in Přibyslav, Czechoslovakia. She was divorced and had two children, Vladimír and Lucie.

Orgoníková died following a long illness on 5 June 2014 in Hradec Králové, Czech Republic, aged 67.

References

Other websites

 Hana Orgoníková at Parlament České republiky, Poslanecká sněmovna 

1946 births
2014 deaths
Czech Social Democratic Party MPs
People from Přibyslav
Members of the Chamber of Deputies of the Czech Republic (1992–1996)
Members of the Chamber of Deputies of the Czech Republic (1996–1998)
Members of the Chamber of Deputies of the Czech Republic (1998–2002)
Members of the Chamber of Deputies of the Czech Republic (2002–2006)
Members of the Chamber of Deputies of the Czech Republic (2006–2010)
Members of the Chamber of Deputies of the Czech Republic (2010–2013)
Czech Technical University in Prague alumni